The khăn rằn is a traditional checkered black and white shawl. It has been adapted from the Cambodian krama, and this is a traditional shawl worn in the region of Mekong Delta in Vietnam. 

During the Vietnam War, the distinctive scarf was donned by the Khmer Rouge and Viet Cong soldiers to identify themselves.

References

External links
Yak Wool Scarf Store

Vietnamese clothing
Vietnamese words and phrases
Scarves
People's Army of Vietnam